Notable people with the surname Toop include:

 David Toop (born 1949), English musician and academic
 Ernest Toop (1895–1976), New Zealand politician and businessman
 Mike Toop, American football coach, retired in 2021
 Richard Toop (1945–2017), English-Australian musicologist

See also
 "Toop Toop", 2006 song by French duo Cassius
 Toop (boat), type of boat in the East-Indies

English-language surnames